Sidney Dean (November 16, 1818 – October 29, 1901) was a United States representative from Connecticut. He was born in Glastonbury, Connecticut where he attended the common schools and Wilbraham and Suffield Academies. He was a minister in the Methodist Episcopal Church from 1843 to 1853, when he retired from the ministry because of impaired health. After leaving the ministry, he engaged in manufacturing in Putnam, Connecticut.

Dean was a member of the Connecticut House of Representatives in 1854 and 1855. He was elected as the candidate of the American Party to the Thirty-fourth Congress and as a Republican to the Thirty-fifth Congress (March 4, 1855 – March 3, 1859). In Congress, he served as chairman, Committee on Public Expenditures (Thirty-fourth Congress). He declined to be a candidate for renomination in 1858. In 1860, Dean reentered the ministry, with pastorates in Pawtucket, Rhode Island, Providence, Rhode Island, and finally in Warren, Rhode Island. During the period 1865-1880, he engaged as editor of the Providence Press, Providence Star, and Rhode Island Press. He also served in the Rhode Island Senate in 1870 and 1871. He also engaged in literary pursuits and lecturing. He died in Brookline, Massachusetts in 1901 and was buried in South Cemetery, Warren, Rhode Island.

References

1818 births
1901 deaths
People from Glastonbury, Connecticut
Politicians from Brookline, Massachusetts
Republican Party members of the Connecticut House of Representatives
American newspaper editors
People from Warren, Rhode Island
Republican Party Rhode Island state senators
Know-Nothing members of the United States House of Representatives from Connecticut
Republican Party members of the United States House of Representatives from Connecticut
Burials in Rhode Island
19th-century American politicians